Uzbekistan competed at the 2016 Summer Paralympics in Rio de Janeiro, Brazil, from 7 to 18 September 2016.

Disability classifications

Every participant at the Paralympics has their disability grouped into one of five disability categories; amputation, the condition may be congenital or sustained through injury or illness; cerebral palsy; wheelchair athletes, there is often overlap between this and other categories; visual impairment, including blindness; Les autres, any physical disability that does not fall strictly under one of the other categories, for example dwarfism or multiple sclerosis. Each Paralympic sport then has its own classifications, dependent upon the specific physical demands of competition. Events are given a code, made of numbers and letters, describing the type of event and classification of the athletes competing. Some sports, such as athletics, divide athletes by both the category and severity of their disabilities, other sports, for example swimming, group competitors from different categories together, the only separation being based on the severity of the disability.

Medalists

| width="78%" align="left" valign="top" |

Competitors
The following is the list of number of competitors participating in the Games:

Athletics (track and field)

Men

Track events

Field events

Women

Field events

Judo 

With one pathway for qualification being having a top finish at the 2014 IBSA Judo World Championships, Uzbekistan earned a qualifying spot in Rio base on the performance of Adiljan Tulendibaev in the men's +100 kg event.  The B2 Judoka finished first in his class.

Men

Women

Powerlifting

Shooting

The country sent shooters to 2015 IPC IPC Shooting World Cup in Osijek, Croatia, where Rio direct qualification was available.  They earned a qualifying spot at this event based on the performance of Server Ibragimov in the P4 – 50m Pistol Mixed SH1 event.

Swimming 

7 Swimmers in 26 events:

See also
 Uzbekistan at the 2016 Summer Olympics
 Uzbekistan at the Paralympics

References

Nations at the 2016 Summer Paralympics
2016
2016 in Uzbekistani sport